Sar Nesa (also Romanized as Sar Nesā’ and Sar Nasā’) is a village in Rud Ab-e Gharbi Rural District, Rud Ab District, Narmashir County, Kerman Province, Iran. At the 2006 census, its population was 494, in 111 families.

References 

Populated places in Narmashir County